United Nations Security Council Resolution 1661, adopted unanimously on March 14, 2006, after reaffirming all resolutions on the situation between Eritrea and Ethiopia, particularly resolutions 1622 (2005) and 1640 (2005), the Council extended the mandate of the United Nations Mission in Ethiopia and Eritrea (UNMEE) for a period of one month until April 15, 2006.

Details
The Security Council reaffirmed its support for the peace process between the two countries and the full implementation of the Algiers Agreement. It stressed that peace in the region could not be achieved without the full demarcation of the mutual border between Eritrea and Ethiopia.

Council members also reaffirmed their commitment to ensure that both parties permitted UNMEE to work freely and provide necessary access, assistance, support and protection during the course of its mandate; the demarcation of the border could not take place without UNMEE's freedom of movement.

Extending UNMEE's mandate for a period of one month as a matter of technicality pending further discussions on its future,  the Council demanded that Ethiopia and Eritrea fully comply with Resolution 1640.

See also
 Badme
 Eritrean–Ethiopian War
 List of United Nations Security Council Resolutions 1601 to 1700 (2005–2006)

References

External links
 
Text of the Resolution at undocs.org

 1661
2006 in Eritrea
2006 in Ethiopia
 1661
 1661
Eritrea–Ethiopia border
March 2006 events